Knyazhpogostsky District (Knjažpogost rajon) is an administrative district (raion), one of the twelve in the Komi Republic, Russia. It is located in the west of the republic. Its administrative center is the town of Yemva. As of the 2010 Census, the total population of the district was 23,432, with the population of Yemva accounting for 62.2% of that number.

Administrative and municipal status
Within the framework of administrative divisions, Knyazhpogostsky District is one of the twelve in the Komi Republic. It is divided into one town of district significance administrative territory (Yemva), one urban-type settlement administrative territory (Sindor), three selo administrative territories, and five settlement administrative territories, all of which comprise forty-five rural localities. As a municipal division, the district is incorporated as Knyazhpogostsky Municipal District. Yemva Town of District Significance Administrative Territory and Sindor Urban-Type Settlement Administrative Territory are incorporated into two urban settlements, and the eight remaining administrative territories are incorporated into eight rural settlements within the municipal district. The town of Yemva serves as the administrative center of both the administrative and municipal districts.

References

Notes

Sources

Districts of the Komi Republic
